History of Intellectual Culture (HIC) is an international yearbook devoted to the history of knowledge. It was founded in 2021 and is published by De Gruyter. Its editors-in-chief are Charlotte A. Lerg (Munich), Johan Östling (Lund), and Jana Weiß (Münster). The yearbook is the successor of the journal of the same name, founded in 1999.

History 
The journal History of Intellectual Culture was conceived in 1999 by University of Calgary professors Dr. Paul Stortz and Dr. E. Lisa Panayotidis. Its first issue was in 2001 and it published original research on intellectual history, cultural history, history of education, etc.

The first issue of the yearbook will be published in 2022 and comprises three sections: articles (an open section); the theme “Participatory Knowledge”; and engaging the field.

Advisory board 
 Peter Burke, University of Cambridge
 Heather Ellis, University of Sheffield
 Tiffany N. Florvil, University of New Mexico
 Adam Kola, Nicolaus Copernicus University
 Suzanne L. Marchand, Louisiana State University
 Pierre-Héli Monot, Ludwig Maximilian University, Munich
 João Ohara, Federal University of Rio de Janeiro
 Eugenia Roldán Vera, Center for Research and Advanced Studies (CINVESTAV), Mexico
 Christa Wirth, University of Agder

References

External links
 Journal website

2001 establishments in Canada
Publications established in 2001
Social history journals
Cultural journals
Biannual journals
English-language journals
University of Calgary